This is a list of Albanian office holders.

 Monarchs
 Heads of State
 Prime Ministers
 Foreign Ministers
 Finance Ministers
 Mayors

 
Politician